Norape xantholopha is a moth of the Megalopygidae family. It was described by Harrison Gray Dyar Jr. in 1914. It is found in Panama, Guatemala, Colombia and Peru.

The wingspan is 35 mm. Adults are white, the forewings without appressed lines and the costa white below.

Subspecies
Norape xantholopha xantholopha (Panama)
Norape xantholopha major Hopp, 1927 (Colombia)
Norape xantholopha minor Hopp, 1927 (Peru)

References

Moths described in 1914
Megalopygidae